George Mutch (21 September 1912 – 30 March 2001) was a Scottish footballer. He played as an inside forward. Born in Aberdeen, Mutch started his football career with Avondale before joining Banks O' Dee. He then moved on to Arbroath, and signed for Manchester United in 1934. He played for United for four years, scoring 49 goals. After leaving, he went to Preston North End, where he helped the club win the 1938 FA Cup Final, the first to be shown on television. In the last minute of extra time, Mutch was fouled. He scored the resulting penalty kick, which rebounded from the underside of the bar, to win the match for Preston North End. Mutch remained with Preston throughout the Second World War, but joined Bury at the cessation of hostilities. After a season with Bury, he joined Southport as a player-trainer, before taking up his training responsibilities on a permanent basis in 1948. He then returned to Scotland as the manager of Banks O' Dee in 1950.

He earned one cap for the Scotland national football team, a 1–0 win over England at Wembley Stadium on 9 April 1938.

References

External links
 Profile at StretfordEnd.co.uk
 Profile at MUFCInfo.com
 
 Profile at LondonHearts.com

1912 births
2001 deaths
Scottish footballers
Scotland international footballers
Manchester United F.C. players
Preston North End F.C. players
Bury F.C. players
Southport F.C. players
Liverpool F.C. wartime guest players
Everton F.C. wartime guest players
Banks O' Dee F.C. players
English Football League players
Arbroath F.C. players
Footballers from Aberdeen
Association football inside forwards
FA Cup Final players